Ferdi Van Den Haute (Deftinge, 5 July 1952) is a Belgian former professional road bicycle racer competing from 1976 to 1987.

Major results

1974
 National Amateur Track Pursuit Championship
 National Amateur Track Madison Championship (with Raphael Constant)
1975
 National Amateur Track Pursuit Championship
 National Amateur Track Madison Championship (with Marc Meernhout)
Circuit du Hainaut
Tour de Liège
Tour de Namur
1976
Essen
Izegem
Mere
 National Amateur Track Omnium Championship
Omloop van Oost-Vlaanderen
Vinkt
Vuelta a España:
Winner stage 7
Kruishoutem
 National Track Omnium Championship (with Patrick Sercu)
1977
Nederbrakel
Stadsprijs Geraardsbergen
Woesten
 National Track Madison Championship (with Patrick Sercu)
Geraardsbergen
1978
GP Franco-Belge
Innsbrück
Stadsprijs Geraardsbergen
Vuelta a España:
Winner stages 3 and 9
Winner points classification
Wattrelos - Meulebeke
Gent–Wevelgem
Aartrijke
1979
Tour de l'Aude
Wezembeek-Oppem
1980
Aalst
Flèche Picarde
 National Track Omnium Championship
Stadsprijs Geraardsbergen
1981
Grand Prix de Denain
Omloop der Vlaamse Ardennen
1982
Kaprijke
Moerbeke
1983
 National Track Omnium Championship
Stadsprijs Geraardsbergen
1984
Stadsprijs Geraardsbergen
Tour de France:
Winner stage 4
Grand Prix of Aargau Canton
Flèche Picarde
Grand Prix de Fourmies
1985
Ronde van Midden-Zeeland
Stadsprijs Geraardsbergen
Herzele
1986
Stadsprijs Geraardsbergen
 Belgian National Road Race Championships
1987
Oostende
Ronse

External links 

Official Tour de France results for Ferdi Van Den Haute

Belgian male cyclists
1952 births
Living people
Belgian Tour de France stage winners
Belgian Vuelta a España stage winners
Cyclists from East Flanders
People from Lierde